The 2nd constituency of the Pyrénées-Atlantiques (French: deuxième circonscription des Pyrénées-Atlantiques) is a French legislative constituency in the Pyrénées-Atlantiques département. Like the other 576 French constituencies, it elects one MP using the two-round system, with a run-off if no candidate receives over 50% of the vote in the first round.

Assembly Members
François Bayrou, the leader of MoDem, held the seat from 1988 until his defeat by the Socialist Party's Nathalie Chabanne in 2012.

Election results

2022

 
 
 
 
 
 
|-
| colspan="8" bgcolor="#E9E9E9"|
|-

2017

|- style="background-color:#E9E9E9;text-align:center;"
! colspan="2" rowspan="2" style="text-align:left;" | Candidate
! rowspan="2" colspan="2" style="text-align:left;" | Party
! colspan="2" | 1st round
! colspan="2" | 2nd round
|- style="background-color:#E9E9E9;text-align:center;"
! width="75" | Votes
! width="30" | %
! width="75" | Votes
! width="30" | %
|-
| style="background-color:" |
| style="text-align:left;" | Jean-Paul Mattei
| style="text-align:left;" | Democratic Movement
| MoDem
| 
| 41.64
| 
| 60.93
|-
| style="background-color:" |
| style="text-align:left;" | Nathalie Chabanne
| style="text-align:left;" | Socialist Party
| PS
| 
| 14.43
| 
| 39.07
|-
| style="background-color:" |
| style="text-align:left;" | Eric Saubatte
| style="text-align:left;" | The Republicans
| LR
| 
| 14.02
| colspan="2" style="text-align:left;" |
|-
| style="background-color:" |
| style="text-align:left;" | Thierry Moutou
| style="text-align:left;" | La France Insoumise
| FI
| 
| 10.03
| colspan="2" style="text-align:left;" |
|-
| style="background-color:" |
| style="text-align:left;" | Joseph Damour
| style="text-align:left;" | National Front
| FN
| 
| 9.23
| colspan="2" style="text-align:left;" |
|-
| style="background-color:" |
| style="text-align:left;" | Héléna Timmer-Blanchard
| style="text-align:left;" | Ecologist
| ECO
| 
| 3.31
| colspan="2" style="text-align:left;" |
|-
| style="background-color:" |
| style="text-align:left;" | Jacques Mauhourat
| style="text-align:left;" | Ecologist
| ECO
| 
| 3.25
| colspan="2" style="text-align:left;" |
|-
| style="background-color:" |
| style="text-align:left;" | Philippe Palengat
| style="text-align:left;" | Miscellaneous Right
| DVD
| 
| 1.22
| colspan="2" style="text-align:left;" |
|-
| style="background-color:" |
| style="text-align:left;" | Alain Baudorre
| style="text-align:left;" | Miscellaneous Right
| DVD
| 
| 1.22
| colspan="2" style="text-align:left;" |
|-
| style="background-color:" |
| style="text-align:left;" | Antoine Missier
| style="text-align:left;" | Far Left
| EXG
| 
| 0.68
| colspan="2" style="text-align:left;" |
|-
| style="background-color:" |
| style="text-align:left;" | Samantha Kerrache
| style="text-align:left;" | Independent
| DIV
| 
| 0.58
| colspan="2" style="text-align:left;" |
|-
| style="background-color:" |
| style="text-align:left;" | Aurélien Corbillon
| style="text-align:left;" | Independent
| DIV
| 
| 0.40
| colspan="2" style="text-align:left;" |
|-
| colspan="8" style="background-color:#E9E9E9;"|
|- style="font-weight:bold"
| colspan="4" style="text-align:left;" | Total
| 
| 100%
| 
| 100%
|-
| colspan="8" style="background-color:#E9E9E9;"|
|-
| colspan="4" style="text-align:left;" | Registered voters
| 
| style="background-color:#E9E9E9;"|
| 
| style="background-color:#E9E9E9;"|
|-
| colspan="4" style="text-align:left;" | Blank/Void ballots
| 
| 2.53%
| 
| 11.14%
|-
| colspan="4" style="text-align:left;" | Turnout
| 
| 55.45%
| 
| 47.48%
|-
| colspan="4" style="text-align:left;" | Abstentions
| 
| 44.55%
| 
| 52.52%
|-
| colspan="8" style="background-color:#E9E9E9;"|
|- style="font-weight:bold"
| colspan="6" style="text-align:left;" | Result
| colspan="2" style="background-color:" | MoDEM GAIN FROM PS
|}

2012
The 2012 election in this constituency attracted media interest as long-serving MP, national political figure and three-time presidential candidate François Bayrou appeared to be facing unprecedented difficulty. The mainstream right had not stood a candidate against him until 2002, and in 2007, the candidate of the Union for a Popular Movement had withdrawn in his favour in the second round. Following Bayrou's personal endorsement of François Hollande for the second round of the 2012 presidential election, however, the UMP withdrew its earlier promise not to stand a candidate against him. The UMP considered standing Frédéric Nihous, a former presidential candidate for a small hunters' party, as its candidate, but Nihous declined, saying he would support the UMP without being its candidate. Local party member Éric Saubatte was chosen instead. Bayrou also had to contend with a Socialist opponent, despite there having been talk in the Socialist Party of not standing a candidate in his constituency, as a gesture of acknowledgment for his endorsement of Hollande.

Under French electoral law, in legislative elections, a third-placed candidate may advance to the second round if he or she obtains the votes of at least 12.5% of registered voters. This is what happened, as third-placed candidate Éric Saubatte (UMP) was able to take part in a three-way runoff vote.

|- style="background-color:#E9E9E9;text-align:center;"
! colspan="2" rowspan="2" style="text-align:left;" | Candidate
! rowspan="2" colspan="2" style="text-align:left;" | Party
! colspan="2" | 1st round
! colspan="2" | 2nd round
|- style="background-color:#E9E9E9;text-align:center;"
! width="75" | Votes
! width="30" | %
! width="75" | Votes
! width="30" | %
|-
| style="background-color:" |
| style="text-align:left;" | Nathalie Chabanne
| style="text-align:left;" | Socialist Party
| PS
| 
| 34.90
| 
| 42.78
|-
| style="background-color:" |
| style="text-align:left;" | François Bayrou
| style="text-align:left;" | Democratic Movement
| MoDem
| 
| 23.63
| 
| 30.17
|-
| style="background-color:" |
| style="text-align:left;" | Éric Saubatte
| style="text-align:left;" | Union for a Presidential Majority
| UMP
| 
| 21.72
| 
| 27.04
|-
| style="background-color:" |
| style="text-align:left;" | Jessica Bernardez
| style="text-align:left;" | National Front
| FN
| 
| 9.32
| colspan="2" style="text-align:left;" |
|-
| style="background-color:" |
| style="text-align:left;" | Denis Labouret
| style="text-align:left;" | Left Front
| FG
| 
| 5.24
| colspan="2" style="text-align:left;" |
|-
| style="background-color:" |
| style="text-align:left;" | Eurydice Bled
| style="text-align:left;" | Europe Ecology – The Greens
| EELV
| 
| 2.74
| colspan="2" style="text-align:left;" |
|-
| style="background-color:" |
| style="text-align:left;" | CANDIDATE
| style="text-align:left;" | Arise the Republic
| DLR
| 
| 0.74
| colspan="2" style="text-align:left;" |
|-
| style="background-color:" |
| style="text-align:left;" | Marc Vercoutere
| style="text-align:left;" | Ecologist
| ECO
| 
| 0.64
| colspan="2" style="text-align:left;" |
|-
| style="background-color:" |
| style="text-align:left;" | Didier Perrin
| style="text-align:left;" | National Centre of Independents and Peasants
| CNIP
| 
| 0.41
| colspan="2" style="text-align:left;" |
|-
| style="background-color:" |
| style="text-align:left;" | Marianne Ligou
| style="text-align:left;" | New Anticapitalist Party
| NPA
| 
| 0.38
| colspan="2" style="text-align:left;" |
|-
| style="background-color:" |
| style="text-align:left;" | Frédéric Steinbauer
| style="text-align:left;" | Workers' Struggle
| LO
| 
| 0.26
| colspan="2" style="text-align:left;" |
|-
| colspan="8" style="background-color:#E9E9E9;"|
|- style="font-weight:bold"
| colspan="4" style="text-align:left;" | Total
| 
| 100%
| 
| 100%
|-
| colspan="8" style="background-color:#E9E9E9;"|
|-
| colspan="4" style="text-align:left;" | Registered voters
| 
| style="background-color:#E9E9E9;"|
| 
| style="background-color:#E9E9E9;"|
|-
| colspan="4" style="text-align:left;" | Blank/Void ballots
| 
| 1.59%
| 
| 2.48%
|-
| colspan="4" style="text-align:left;" | Turnout
| 
| 62.80%
| 
| 61.99%
|-
| colspan="4" style="text-align:left;" | Abstentions
| 
| 37.20%
| 
| 38.01%
|-
| colspan="8" style="background-color:#E9E9E9;"|
|- style="font-weight:bold"
| colspan="6" style="text-align:left;" | Result
| colspan="2" style="background-color:" | PS GAIN FROM MoDEM
|}

2007
Although François Bayou kept his seat, he switched from the UDF to his newly founded MoDem.

Any candidate obtaining the votes of at least 12.5% of registered voters could advance to the second round. The candidate of the Union for a Popular Movement, Jean-Pierre Marine, finished second behind Bayrou in the first round, and withdrew from the second, endorsing Bayrou so as not to split the centre-right electorate between two candidates. Third-placed Socialist candidate Marie-Pierre Cabanne was thus Bayrou's only opponent in the final round.

|- style="background-color:#E9E9E9;text-align:center;"
! colspan="2" rowspan="2" style="text-align:left;" | Candidate
! rowspan="2" colspan="2" style="text-align:left;" | Party
! colspan="2" | 1st round
! colspan="2" | 2nd round
|- style="background-color:#E9E9E9;text-align:center;"
! width="75" | Votes
! width="30" | %
! width="75" | Votes
! width="30" | %
|-
| style="background-color:" |
| style="text-align:left;" | François Bayrou
| style="text-align:left;" | Democratic Movement
| MoDem
| 
| 37.25
| 
| 61.21
|-
| style="background-color:" |
| style="text-align:left;" | Jean-Pierre Marine
| style="text-align:left;" | Union for a Presidential Majority
| UMP
| 
| 25.92
| colspan="2" style="text-align:centre;" | WITHDREW
|-
| style="background-color:" |
| style="text-align:left;" | Marie-Pierre Cabanne
| style="text-align:left;" | Socialist Party
| PS
| 
| 23.32
| 
| 38.79
|-
| style="background-color:" |
| style="text-align:left;" | Frédéric Nihous
| style="text-align:left;" | Hunting, Fishing, Nature and Traditions
| CPNT
| 
| 2.39
| colspan="2" style="text-align:left;" |
|-
| style="background-color:" |
| style="text-align:left;" | Nicole Juyoux
| style="text-align:left;" | The Greens
| LV
| 
| 2.36
| colspan="2" style="text-align:left;" |
|-
| style="background-color:" |
| style="text-align:left;" | Michèle Darricarrere
| style="text-align:left;" | National Front
| FN
| 
| 2.29
| colspan="2" style="text-align:left;" |
|-
| style="background-color:" |
| style="text-align:left;" | Claire Rey
| style="text-align:left;" | Communist Party
| PCF
| 
| 1.92
| colspan="2" style="text-align:left;" |
|-
| style="background-color:" |
| style="text-align:left;" | Bruno Bajou
| style="text-align:left;" | Revolutionary Communist League
| LCR
| 
| 1.70
| colspan="2" style="text-align:left;" |
|-
| style="background-color:" |
| style="text-align:left;" | Pierre Arrabie-Aubies
| style="text-align:left;" | Far Left
| EXG
| 
| 0.75
| colspan="2" style="text-align:left;" |
|-
| style="background-color:" |
| style="text-align:left;" | Roger Falliex
| style="text-align:left;" | Movement for France
| MPF
| 
| 0.75
| colspan="2" style="text-align:left;" |
|-
| style="background-color:" |
| style="text-align:left;" | Karine Zebda
| style="text-align:left;" | Independent
| DIV
| 
| 0.56
| colspan="2" style="text-align:left;" |
|-
| style="background-color:" |
| style="text-align:left;" | Alain Pecassou
| style="text-align:left;" | Independent
| DIV
| 
| 0.46
| colspan="2" style="text-align:left;" |
|-
| style="background-color:" |
| style="text-align:left;" | Frédéric Steinbauer
| style="text-align:left;" | Far Left
| EXG
| 
| 0.33
| colspan="2" style="text-align:left;" |
|-
| style="background-color:" |
| style="text-align:left;" | Marc Vercoutère
| style="text-align:left;" | Independent
| DIV
| 
| 0.01
| colspan="2" style="text-align:left;" |
|-
| colspan="8" style="background-color:#E9E9E9;"|
|- style="font-weight:bold"
| colspan="4" style="text-align:left;" | Total
| 
| 100%
| 
| 100%
|-
| colspan="8" style="background-color:#E9E9E9;"|
|-
| colspan="4" style="text-align:left;" | Registered voters
| 
| style="background-color:#E9E9E9;"|
| 
| style="background-color:#E9E9E9;"|
|-
| colspan="4" style="text-align:left;" | Blank/Void ballots
| 
| 1.29%
| 
| 10.02%
|-
| colspan="4" style="text-align:left;" | Turnout
| 
| 66.78%
| 
| 62.74%
|-
| colspan="4" style="text-align:left;" | Abstentions
| 
| 33.22%
| 
| 37.26%
|-
| colspan="8" style="background-color:#E9E9E9;"|
|- style="font-weight:bold"
| colspan="6" style="text-align:left;" | Result
| colspan="2" style="background-color:" | MoDEM GAIN FROM UDF
|}

2002

|- style="background-color:#E9E9E9;text-align:center;"
! colspan="2" rowspan="2" style="text-align:left;" | Candidate
! rowspan="2" colspan="2" style="text-align:left;" | Party
! colspan="2" | 1st round
! colspan="2" | 2nd round
|- style="background-color:#E9E9E9;text-align:center;"
! width="75" | Votes
! width="30" | %
! width="75" | Votes
! width="30" | %
|-
| style="background-color:" |
| style="text-align:left;" | François Bayrou
| style="text-align:left;" | Union for French Democracy
| UDF
| 
| 41.79
| 
| 55.58
|-
| style="background-color:" |
| style="text-align:left;" | Georges Labazee
| style="text-align:left;" | Socialist Party
| PS
| 
| 31.41
| 
| 44.42
|-
| style="background-color:" |
| style="text-align:left;" | Jean Saint-Josse
| style="text-align:left;" | Hunting, Fishing, Nature and Traditions
| CPNT
| 
| 9.43
| colspan="2" style="text-align:left;" |
|-
| style="background-color:" |
| style="text-align:left;" | Marie-France Llucia-Latour
| style="text-align:left;" | National Front
| FN
| 
| 6.59
| colspan="2" style="text-align:left;" |
|-
| style="background-color:" |
| style="text-align:left;" | Nicole Juyoux
| style="text-align:left;" | The Greens
| LV
| 
| 2.99
| colspan="2" style="text-align:left;" |
|-
| style="background-color:" |
| style="text-align:left;" | Yves Péré
| style="text-align:left;" | Communist Party
| PCF
| 
| 2.68
| colspan="2" style="text-align:left;" |
|-
| style="background-color:" |
| style="text-align:left;" | Christiane Alias
| style="text-align:left;" | Revolutionary Communist League
| LCR
| 
| 1.31
| colspan="2" style="text-align:left;" |
|-
| style="background-color:" |
| style="text-align:left;" | Colette Ducousso
| style="text-align:left;" | Movement for France
| MPF
| 
| 1.18
| colspan="2" style="text-align:left;" |
|-
| style="background-color:" |
| style="text-align:left;" | Frédéric Steinbauer
| style="text-align:left;" | Workers' Struggle
| LO
| 
| 0.64
| colspan="2" style="text-align:left;" |
|-
| style="background-color:" |
| style="text-align:left;" | Michel Dantin
| style="text-align:left;" | Regionalist
| REG
| 
| 0.57
| colspan="2" style="text-align:left;" |
|-
| style="background-color:" |
| style="text-align:left;" | Michel Catuhe
| style="text-align:left;" | Other
| AUT
| 
| 0.49
| colspan="2" style="text-align:left;" |
|-
| style="background-color:" |
| style="text-align:left;" | Henri Daudu
| style="text-align:left;" | National Republican Movement
| MNR
| 
| 0.49
| colspan="2" style="text-align:left;" |
|-
| style="background-color:" |
| style="text-align:left;" | Ginette Desport
| style="text-align:left;" | Far Right
| EXD
| 
| 0.40
| colspan="2" style="text-align:left;" |
|-
| style="background-color:" |
| style="text-align:left;" | Didier Calmon
| style="text-align:left;" | Far Left
| EXG
| 
| 0.00
| colspan="2" style="text-align:left;" |
|-
| colspan="8" style="background-color:#E9E9E9;"|
|- style="font-weight:bold"
| colspan="4" style="text-align:left;" | Total
| 
| 100%
| 
| 100%
|-
| colspan="8" style="background-color:#E9E9E9;"|
|-
| colspan="4" style="text-align:left;" | Registered voters
| 
| style="background-color:#E9E9E9;"|
| 
| style="background-color:#E9E9E9;"|
|-
| colspan="4" style="text-align:left;" | Blank/Void ballots
| 
| 2.06%
| 
| 4.48%
|-
| colspan="4" style="text-align:left;" | Turnout
| 
| 71.86%
| 
| 68.09%
|-
| colspan="4" style="text-align:left;" | Abstentions
| 
| 28.14%
| 
| 31.91%
|-
| colspan="8" style="background-color:#E9E9E9;"|
|- style="font-weight:bold"
| colspan="6" style="text-align:left;" | Result
| colspan="2" style="background-color:" | UDF HOLD
|}

References

2